Heading for England or  Richting Engeland  is a 1992 Dutch film directed by André van Duren.

Cast
Gerard Thoolen	... 	Verteller
Geert Lageveen	... 	Hans
Maike Meijer	... 	Sonja
Peter Faber	... 	Vader van hans
Rick Nicolet	... 	Moeder van hans
Herman Veerkamp	... 	Broer van hans
Wim Van Der Grijn	... 	Leraar duits
Trins Snijders	... 	Lerares engels
Huib Broos	... 	Tekenleraar
Hein van der Heijden	... 	Jaap
Peter Paul Muller	... 	Wim
Cees Mooij	... 	Henkie
Carol van Herwijnen	... 	Kapper oostinga
Henry Drumond	... 	Joris
Jurrian Knijtijzer	... 	Jonge hans

External links 
 

Dutch drama films
1992 films
1990s Dutch-language films
Films directed by André van Duren